Radio Free Albemuth is the debut solo album by bassist Stuart Hamm, released in 1988 on Relativity Records. Hamm is backed up by guitarists Allan Holdsworth and Joe Satriani. The title of the album and many of the songs were inspired by the novels of Philip K. Dick.

Track listing

Personnel
 Stuart Hamm – bass guitar, production
 Allan Holdsworth – SynthAxe on "Radio Free Albemuth"
 Joe Satriani – electric guitar on "Radio Free Albemuth", "Flow My Tears" and "Sexually Active"
 Mike Barsimanto – drums
 Amy Knoles – percussion on "Radio Free Albemuth"
 Scott Collard – keyboards
 Glen Freundl – keyboards on "Radio Free Albemuth", "Sexually Active" and "Country Music"
 Tommy Mars – keyboards on "Radio Free Albemuth"
 Charles Hamm – front cover photo
 Mark Effords – back cover photo
 David Bett – design

References

Stuart Hamm albums
1988 albums